Barclay may refer to one of two southern Ontario communities:
 Barclay, Innisfil near the western shore of Lake Simcoe
 Barclay, Kawartha Lakes